Vanhouttea is a genus of flowering plants in the African violet family Gesneriaceae, native to southeast Brazil. They are pollinated by hummingbirds.

Species
Currently accepted species include:

Vanhouttea bradeana Hoehne
Vanhouttea brueggeri Chautems
Vanhouttea calcarata Lem.
Vanhouttea fruticulosa (Glaz. ex Hoehne) Chautems
Vanhouttea gardneri (Hook.) Fritsch
Vanhouttea hilariana Chautems
Vanhouttea lanata Fritsch
Vanhouttea leonii Chautems
Vanhouttea mollis Fritsch
Vanhouttea pendula Chautems

References

Gesnerioideae
Gesneriaceae genera